Michael Kohlmann and Philipp Marx were the defending champions; however, they chose participating in ATP World Tour tournaments (Kohlmann in Memphis and Marx in Marseille).
Ilija Bozoljac and Jamie Delgado won in the final 6–3, 6–3, against Dustin Brown and Martin Slanar.

Seeds

Draw

Draw

External links
 Doubles Draw

GEMAX Open - Doubles
GEMAX Open